The Norfolk four-course system is a method of agriculture that involves crop rotation. Unlike earlier methods such as the three-field system, the Norfolk system is marked by an absence of a fallow year. Instead, four different crops are grown in each year of a four-year cycle: wheat, turnips, barley, and clover or undergrass.

This system was developed in the early 16th century in the region of Waasland (in present-day northern Belgium), and was popularized in the 18th century by British agriculturist Charles Townshend. The sequence of four crops (wheat, turnips, barley and clover), included a fodder crop and a grazing crop, allowing livestock to be bred year-round. The Norfolk four-course system was a key development in the British Agricultural Revolution. The rotation between arable and ley is sometimes called ley farming.

See also
 Crop rotation
 Two-field system
 Three-field system

References

Agricultural soil science
Agriculture in England
Genetic engineering and agriculture